The Sick Bag Song is a book of non-fiction and poetry by Nick Cave, released in 2015.

The book was announced in March 2015. Cave handwrote the book on airplane sick bags while on tour in North America in 2014.

References

2015 non-fiction books
2015 poetry books
Books by Nick Cave
Australian poetry collections
Canongate Books books